Girls Gone By Publishers  is a publishing company run by Clarissa Cridland and Ann Mackie-Hunter and is based in Coleford, Somerset. They re-publish new editions of some of the most popular girls' fiction titles from the twentieth century.

Elinor Brent-Dyer

Re-published titles by Elinor Brent-Dyer include:

Two Sams at the Chalet School (2008)
Trouble at Skelton Hall (2009)
Three Go to the Chalet School (2007)
Ruey Richardson - Chaletian (2009)
The New House at the Chalet School (2008)
The New Chalet School (2009)
A Head Girl's Difficulties (2008)
A Genius at the Chalet School (2007)
The Feud in the Chalet School (2009)
Excitements at the Chalet School (2007)
The Coming of Age of the Chalet School (2008)
The Chalet School in Exile (2009)
The Chalet School Christmas Story Book (2007)
The Chalet Girls' Cookbook (2009)
Carola Storms the Chalet School (2008)
Adrienne and the Chalet School (2009)

Girls Gone By Publishers own the copyright of all works, unpublished and published by Elinor Brent Dyer.

Margaret Biggs

Re-published titles by Margaret Biggs include:

The Blakes Come to Melling
The New Prefect at Melling
Last Term for Helen
Head Girl of Melling (2005)
The New Girl at Melling (2006)
Summer Term at Melling (2007)
Susan in the Sixth (2007)
Kate at Melling (2008)
Changes at Melling (2009)

Angela Brazil

Re-published titles by Angela Brazil include:

A Fourth Form Friendship (2006)

Dorita Fairlie Bruce

The following list of republished titles written by Dorita Fairlie Bruce is based on a search on the Jisc Library Hub Discover database.  All of the republished works are paperbacks.
The best bat in the school and other stories (2004) 
Nancy returns to St. Bride's (2005) 
The school on the moor (2006) 
The school in the woods (2007) 
Toby at Tibbs Cross (2008) 
The serendipity shop (2009) 
Triffeny (2010) 
The debatable mound (2011) 
Dimsie and the Jane Willard Foundation (2011) 
The bartle bequest (2012) 
Wild goose quest (2013)

Monica Edwards

Re-published titles by Monica Edwards include: 
Hidden in a Dream (2006)
Storm Ahead (2005)
No Entry (2005)
The Nightbird (2006)
Operation Seabird (2007)
Strangers to the Marsh (2007)
No Going Back (2008)
The Hoodwinkers (2008)
Dolphin Summer (2009)
A Wind Is Blowing (2009) 
The Wild One (2010)

(Girls Gone By Publishers are planning to re-publish the entire output of Monica Edwards).

Josephine Elder

Re-published titles by Josephine Elder include:

Evelyn Finds Herself (2006)

Antonia Forest

Re-published titles by Antonia Forest include: 
Celebrating Antonia Forest (2008)
The Thursday Kidnapping (2009)

Lorna Hill

Re-published titles by Lorna Hill include: 
Border Peel  (2007)
The Vicarage Children (2008)
Northern Lights (2009)
More About Mandy (2009)

Clare Mallory

Re-published titles by Clare Mallory include 

The New House at Winwood  (2008)
The League of the Smallest (2009)

Violet Needham

Re-published titles by Violet Needham include: 

The House of the Paladin  (2006)
Pandora of Parrham Royal (2009)
The Red Rose of Ruvina (2009)
The Secret of the White Peacock (2008)

Elsie Jeanette Oxenham

Re-published titles by Elsie Jeanette Oxenham include:

Goblin Island (2007)
Jen of the Abbey School (2007)
Maidlin Bears the Torch (2009)
The New Abbey Girls (2008)

Malcolm Saville

Re-published titles by Malcolm Saville include:

The Elusive Grasshopper (2008)
The Gay Dolphin Adventure (2007)
Lone Pine Five (2008)
The Neglected Mountain (2009)
Saucers Over the Moor (2009)
The Secret of Grey Walls (2007)

Geoffrey Trease

Re-published titles by Geoffrey Trease include:

A Whiff of Burnt Boats (2009)

Non fiction

Girls Gone By Publishers also publish non-fiction titles based on the work of their re-published authors, such as Antonia Forest, Elsie Jeanette Oxenham, Monica Edwards and Geoffrey Trease.

Notes

References

External links
The Girls Gone By Publishers website.

Children's book publishers
Book publishing companies of the United Kingdom
Companies based in Bath, Somerset